Gauripur (IPA: ˈgɑʊrɪˌpʊə  or ˈgɔːrɪˌpʊə) is a semi-urban town under Gauripur Town Committee in the Dhubri district in the state of Assam, India.

Geography
Its average elevation is 26 metres (85 feet). The nearest airport is situated at Rupsi, adjacent to the village Khudimari.
Gauripur is a small town on the western side of the district headquarters Dhubri. The main town is near the eastern shore of the river Gadadhar. There is a lake on its north-western side named Laokhowa beel and on the north-eastern side, on the bank of Gadadhar, is a small hill-top called Matiabagh, on which the palace "Hawakhana" erected by the Zamindar of Gauripur is found. On the other side of the Gadadhar river is the famous village Asharikandi, of international fame for its terrakota industry. The Gauripur town is served by the Northeast Frontier Railway of the Indian Railway network. The national highway 31 runs across the town. It is situated 10 km from Dhubri town, the HQ of the district.

History

The establishment of the town and the name "Gauripur" has an interesting story associated with the main architect of Gauripur, Raja Pratap Chandra Barua.  It is believed that Raja Barua was hunting in the forest and came across a frog eating a snake. He was astonished to see this unnatural and unheard of sight. Being a strong devotee of the Goddess Mahamaya, he was convinced that what he saw was a supernatural message for him. Shortly afterwards, he established a temple for Goddess Mahamaya and named it Gauripur after the alias "Gauri" of Mahamaya.

Demographics
 India census, Gauripur had a population of 25,124. Males constitute 52% of the population and females 48%. Gauripur has an average literacy rate of 75%, higher than the national average of 59.5%, with male literacy at 81%, and female literacy at 69%. In Gauripur, 11% of the population is under six years of age.

Politics
Gauripur is part of Dhubri (Lok Sabha constituency).

Transport
Gauripur Railway Station (GUP2) serves the town. The railway station lies under Alipurduar railway division of Northeast Frontier Railway zone.

Notable people
 Pramathesh Barua, actor, director, and screenwriter
 Pratima Barua Pandey, prominent folk singer
 Rebati Mohan Dutta Choudhury, noted Assamese litterateur

References

Cities and towns in Dhubri district
Dhubri